Route 666 is The Hamsters fourth CD release, and like the previous album, The Hamsters, was a studio recording using many uncharacteristic overdubs and other studio techniques.

The album was recorded during the tail-end of Zsa Zsa's absence due to illness, though he returned for two of the tracks.

Track listing
 "Route 666" – 6:17
 "Rocket In My Pocket" – 4:07
 "The Blues On Their Own" – 4:26
 "Come To Poppa" – 5:06
 "Ain't Living Long Like This" – 4:31
 "Tear It Up" – 5:28
 "Boogie Man" – 3:52
 "Only Rock'n'Roll" – 3:04
 "It Is What It Is" – 3:57
 "Over You" – 6:36

Musicians
Snail's-Pace Slim — guitars, lead vocals.
Rev Otis Elevator — drums, vocals.
Dave Bronze — bass (all tracks except 1 and 3).
Ms Zsa Zsa Poltergeist — bass (on tracks 1 and 3), vocals.

Guest musicians
 Josh Phillips — keyboards.
 Roger Cotton — keyboards.

Production
 Engineered by Roger Cotton and Bill Hill.
 mixed by Snail's-Pace Slim, Rev. Otis Elevator, Roger Cotton and Bill Hill.
 Produced by Snail's-Pace Slim.
 Mastered by Arun Hakraverty.
 Edited by Pete Cippa.
 Recorded at Roundel Studios, Horton Kirby, Kent, UK.
 Mastered at The Master Room
 Cover design by Phil Smee of Waldo's Design Emporium.
 Image manipulation by Keith Phillips (Advanced Graphics)
 Band photography by Gered Mankowitz

1990 albums
The Hamsters albums